William Schofield (February 14, 1857 – June 10, 1912) was a United States circuit judge of the United States Court of Appeals for the First Circuit and the United States Circuit Courts for the First Circuit.

Education and career

William Schofield was born in Dudley, Massachusetts on February 14, 1857. He received a Bachelor of Laws from Harvard Law School in 1883, and served as a law clerk to United States Supreme Court Justice Horace Gray from 1883 to 1885.

He married Ednah M. Green on December 1, 1892.

He was in private practice of law in Boston, Massachusetts from 1885 to 1903, serving as an instructor at Harvard University from 1886 to 1892, and as a member of the Massachusetts House of Representatives from 1899 to 1902. He was an associate judge of the Massachusetts Superior Court from 1903 to 1911.

Federal judicial service

Schofield was nominated by President William Howard Taft on May 25, 1911, to a joint seat on the United States Court of Appeals for the First Circuit and the United States Circuit Courts for the First Circuit vacated by Judge Francis Cabot Lowell. He was confirmed by the United States Senate on June 6, 1911, and received his commission the same day. On December 31, 1911, the Circuit Courts were abolished and he thereafter served only on the Court of Appeals. His service terminated on June 10, 1912, due to his death.

See also 
 List of law clerks of the Supreme Court of the United States (Seat 2)

References

Sources
 

1857 births
1912 deaths
American lawyers
Harvard Law School alumni
Law clerks of the Supreme Court of the United States
Judges of the United States Court of Appeals for the First Circuit
Members of the Massachusetts House of Representatives
Massachusetts Superior Court justices
United States court of appeals judges appointed by William Howard Taft
20th-century American judges
Politicians from Malden, Massachusetts